Franciszek Kukla (born 16 July 1953), is a Polish former ice hockey player. He mainly played for Polonia Bytom during his career, with one season for KHK Red Star in Yugoslavia. He also played for the Polish national team at the 1988 Winter Olympics and several World Championships.

References

External links
 

1953 births
Living people
Ice hockey players at the 1988 Winter Olympics
KHK Red Star players
Olympic ice hockey players of Poland
Polish ice hockey goaltenders
Sportspeople from Bytom
TMH Polonia Bytom players
Polish expatriate sportspeople in Yugoslavia